Mikiel Habtom (born 1 January 1991) is an Eritrean cyclist.

Major results
2015
 10th Overall Tour du Faso
1st  Points classification
1st Stages 3, 5 & 7
2016
 1st Fenkil Northern Red Sea Challenge
 3rd Road race, National Road Championships
 4th Overall Tour Eritrea
2017
 1st Asmara Circuit
2018
 10th Overall Tour of Mediterrennean
2021
 African Road Championships
1st  Team time trial
2nd  Mixed Relay TTT

References

External links

1991 births
Living people
Eritrean male cyclists
21st-century Eritrean people